Bolma myrica is a species of sea snail, a marine gastropod mollusk in the family Turbinidae, the turban snails.

Description

Distribution
This marine species occurs off Japan.

References

 Okutani T. (2001). Six new bathyal and shelf Trochoidean species in Japan. Venus 60(3): 121-127

External links

myrica
Gastropods described in 2001